This is a list of the railway stations in the public transport network of Auckland. It includes closed and planned stations. Auckland has 13 fare zones, with some zone overlap areas. The routes shown pass into and out of central, western, eastern, and southern zones.

Ownership and operation 
Station platforms on the Auckland suburban network are owned by KiwiRail, who are responsible for building stations. Structures on the platforms (station buildings, shelters, lights, signage etc.) are owned by Auckland Transport, who are responsible for the operation and maintenance of stations.

The Britomart Transport Centre, Newmarket Railway Station and New Lynn Transport Centre are owned and managed by Auckland Transport.

Ticket office and platform staff, as well as train operating staff, are employed by Auckland One Rail.

Train services using stations in Auckland include suburban trains, which are owned by Auckland Transport and operated by Auckland One Rail, and the Northern Explorer long-distance train to Wellington operated by KiwiRail.

Geographic map

Network

New stations 
Te Waihorotiu and Karanga-a-Hape stations, underground stations in the city centre, will open when the City Rail Link (CRL) is completed in late 2024. Mount Eden railway station was closed in 2020 and is being replaced by Maungawhau / Mount Eden railway station; this is where the CRL meets the Western Line.

Drury, Ngākōroa and Paerātā stations are being built within the next decade, and a new station at Tironui is proposed, to serve new urban areas developing in the south of the city.

See also 
 List of suburban and commuter rail systems
 City Rail Link

References 

 Rail
Railway
Auckland